Sanctuary RPG is an adventure game developed by Black Shell Games. The game was released on April 29, 2014 for Microsoft Windows.

Gameplay
Sanctuary RPG is a role-playing game that uses ASCII art to render its world. In the game, players control an adventurer searching for an entity called- The Matron. Players explore the sprawling locales of Westhaven in addition to the main storyline. Players must defeat many enemies on their travels, ranging from slimes to skeletons and robots. The game utilizes permadeath in its default mode, eliminating the option to respawn after death.

In the game, players have characters that progress through the game which is the goal of defeating enemies and bosses.

Players select destinations via the context menu to explore the game world and engage in battle with various enemies via a combo-based combat system. Winning battles grants the player gold, experience points, and items. In addition to combat, players explore the world and talk to various non-player characters throughout the game. The game has a crafting system that allows players to create weapons and armor.

Reception
PC Gamer Tom Sykes describes the game as “a streamlined and grind-free take on Final Fantasy and Dragon Quest and early Ultima and Things Like That”. He goes on further to elaborate that the game is “an expansive first person-ish fantasy world you interact with by typing numbers on your keyboard.” With regard to the game world itself, he noted that “Narration and dialogue is playful and pretty funny, while the lack of painstakingly drawn art has allowed the team to imagine outlandish creatures and scenarios to their heart's content.” Pearson concluded, “Despite appearances – and despite the whole permadeath thing in Classic mode – Sanctuary is actually fairly streamlined and forgiving, downplaying time sinky stuff like inventory management to ensure that you're always moving forward.”

Rock Paper Shotgun Konstantinos Dimopoulos's review of the game states, “Describing SanctuaryRPG as a huge, hilarious and most honorable devourer of free time would be an understatement. Also, a rather vague statement too, as this freeware beauty also happens to be a proper, full-fledged text-based RPG with some terrific ASCII illustrations and outrageous bosses, that lets you fantasize about being anything from a burly barbarian or a pious paladin to a roaming ranger or a wicked wizard.”

Destructoid Patrick Hancock praised the game, stating that “It's got a very old-school vibe thanks to the ASCII graphics and UI, but the combat feels modern and intelligent. It caters to a wide variety of players, even if you don't have any sort of nostalgia for games like Nethack or Zork.”

NewEgg David Sanchez remarked about the gameplay, stating “The stellar blend of roguelike, RPG, dungeon crawler, and text adventure makes for a quest that’s overflowing with variety and practically nonstop entertainment. Throw in a few side quests and the inclusion of six character classes, and you’ve got a diverse retro-themed quest that’s a sheer blast all the way through.”

Hardcore Gamer's Jahanzeb Khan especially enjoyed the battle system, noting that “SanctuaryRPG has a fast-paced and truly engaging turn based battle system, and you find yourself so swept away by the flow of it that it’s easy to have a split second slip-up and immediately taste defeat after. You sometimes forget how it’s supposed to be turn-based affair and that you can take your time during your turn, because you can’t help but react impulsively out of instinct. Such is its design, and there’s so much going. Spells, combo attacks, character re-positioning, and extravagantly named ultra special attacks, SanctuaryRPG literally has it all.”

Gamasutra Lena LeRay writes “Where the game really shines in terms of gameplay is in promoting player choice in all things and making those choices matter.” Remarking on the game's unique and stylistic design choices, she notes “Its blend of modern game design and old-school aesthetic isn't quite like anything I've seen so far.” LeRay also makes mention of the game's in-depth system of customizing loot, stating that it is “an extensive crafting system in which the player must balance material durability with increasing progress towards completion and increasing quality.”

Kotaku Logan Booker adds “Despite being drawn with a limited set of colours and characters, it looks quite good and sufficiently adventurous.” Booker notes that the game's sizable download size, in lieu of its ASCII art exterior by saying, “Don’t let appearances fool you—the game in its current state weighs in at 93MB. So, there’s definitely some meat there.”

Softpedia Alexandru Chirila states that the game is “An RPG with humor that’s sharper than any sword you’ll be using to battle monsters.” He also indicates that the game humorously defies logic by stating that “Most of the charm that comes out of SanctuaryRPG is from its witty and unexpectedly logical storytelling of a world that’s populated by vicious beasts, slimy worms that like to be petted and robots that put themselves together after you defeat them.”

References

External links
 

2014 video games
Action-adventure games
Freeware games
Indie video games
Science fiction video games
Single-player video games
Video games developed in the United States
Windows games
Windows-only games
Roguelike video games